Castelpoto is a comune (municipality) in the Province of Benevento in the Italian region Campania, located about 50 km northeast of Naples and about 7 km west of Benevento.

Castelpoto borders the following municipalities: Apollosa, Benevento, Campoli del Monte Taburno, Foglianise, Vitulano.

References

External links
 Official website

Cities and towns in Campania